Glozhene may refer to:

 Glozhene, Lovech Province, a village in Teteven Municipality, Bulgaria
 Glozhene Monastery, a monastery near the village of Glozhene, Lovech Province
 Glozhene Cove, a cove in Antarctica named after the village of Glozhene, Lovech Province, and the Glozhene Monastery
 Glozhene, Vratsa Province